Rumuokoro is a town in Obio-Akpor local government area of Rivers State, Nigeria. It is the meeting point of five major roads in Nigerian Economy and the gateway to and from the city of Port Harcourt.

Transport
It is the first point of call when arriving from Warri, Benin City, Lagos, Abuja, Owerri, Onitsha and the Port Harcourt International Airport. It houses multiple bus stops and travellers catch buses or taxis into any part of the Port Harcourt city from there.

Communities
Rumuokoro clan consist of five communities; Rukpakwulusi, Eligbolo, Awalama, Rumuagholu and Elieke.

Facilities
The strategic location of Rumuokoro makes it one of the most popular town to traveller to Rivers State. It hosts Federal Government College Rumuokoro Port Harcourt, Nigerian Army 2 
Amphibious Brigade (Bori Camp), part of the Air force Base, Community Secondary School, Okoro nu Odo. Okoro nu Odo Community Secondary School is  located in  Rumuagholu town. Rumuagholu  is  unique. Because of its hospitality, the town is witnessing the arrival of people from all over the world who  are relocating. The inhabitants of Rumuagholu are very friendly, kind, very intelligent, and  well educated, One of the major empowerment and vocational training programme in Rumuokoro which has touched thousands of locals residing in Rumuokoro including students of University of Port Harcourt being Lingrand Visionary Global located at the heart of Rumuokoro Junction.

References

External links

 
Geography of Port Harcourt

Towns in Rivers State
Obio-Akpor